Music for Babies is an album by the British musician Howie B, which was released in 1996. It is about becoming a father.

Run Wrake produced an animated short to accompany the album.

Production
The album was produced by Howie B. It incorporates strands of trip-hop, jazz, ambient house, and dub.

Critical reception

The Irish Times wrote that "the opening two tracks, beatless and bereft of rhythm, are gorgeous examples of extra chilled head music." The Guardian called the album "superb," writing that it "is imbued throughout with a funky, chilled-out ambience."

The Independent determined that the album "may well provide a softly comforting soundtrack to his new daughter's life, but the slowly modulated electronic tones and textures of Howie B's album struggle to offer any more substantial value." Robert Christgau concluded that the musician "takes the aimless vapidity of ambient another step toward total stasis."

AllMusic wrote that "though Music for Babies is one step ahead of most fill-in-the-dots trip-hop, its sleepy mood is a bit too infantile." The Sunday Times deemed it "sweet but overrated."

Track listing

References

Howie B albums
1996 albums
Polydor Records albums